is a 2010 Japanese independent supernatural horror film written and directed by Toshikazu Nagae. Commissioned by the Japanese distributor Presidio Corporation, the film is based on the 2007 American film Paranormal Activity by Oren Peli and documents events that follow from the original film. Paranormal Activity 2: Tokyo Night was screened at various locations across Japan by Cinema Sunshine. It was later screened in various other countries.

Plot
In 2010, during a stay in San Diego, California, Japanese student Haruka Yamano (Noriko Aoyama) is involved in a car accident that breaks both of her legs. She returns to her home in Tokyo, Japan. Shigeyuki, her father, leaves for a business trip abroad, leaving her with her 19-year-old younger brother Koichi (Aoi Nakamura).

One morning, Haruka discovers that her wheelchair has moved even though the wheels were locked. Koichi suspects it to be a paranormal force and places a mound of salt in Haruka’s room, which becomes scattered the next day. Despite Haruka being dismissive, Koichi investigates further, and eventually, she lets him continue filming after a glass cup spontaneously breaks during dinner. Soon, they notice that multiple objects around the house have moved on their own from the camera footage. On the day when Koichi's friend Jun Nagoshi (Kōsuke Kujirai) visits with his girlfriend and her friend Misuzu Kure, Misuzu screams and foams at the mouth while examining Haruka's room.

Koichi contacts a Shinto priest for a purification ceremony, and after the priest has done so, he tells the siblings that the presence has calmed down. After two days with no incidents, their father Shigeyuki returns home. On night 12, Haruka’s wheelchair moves toward the camera and cuts it off, making the siblings realize that the presence is still in the house. Koichi tries contacting the Shinto priest but is told the priest died of a heart attack after leaving them. The incidents begin to worsen in violence, as Haruka is dragged out of bed by her hair. Haruka tries to contact Shigeyuki but he does not answer his call.

Haruka recalls Katie, a woman involved in the same car accident that cut her trip short. After researching her online, she believes that the demon that had possessed Katie is now targeting them. She reveals to Koichi that she experienced similar strange phenomena while recuperating in the hospital in America. That night, she shows him a strange bite mark on her arm before losing consciousness. In the morning, Koichi places a crucifix in her hand. After he leaves, Haruka drops the crucifix, and it combusts, with windows breaking. Upon discovering the scorched crucifix and broken glass, Koichi becomes shocked and devastated.

On night 15, Haruka wakes up at 1 AM and stands by Koichi's bedside, staring at him for two hours while he is asleep. She then walks downstairs and screams. Alarmed, Koichi runs down and discovers Shigeyuki’s corpse in the closet. A possessed Haruka becomes violent, causing Koichi to flee and board a taxi. As he escapes, Haruka appears in front, and the taxi strikes into her before crashing.

Through security footage at a funeral home, Koichi arrives to pay his respects to Haruka, who is believed to have died in the crash. When he removes the sheet, he is shocked to see it is the body of the taxi driver. Koichi is suddenly dragged into the darkness screaming and the camera cuts. When it runs again, Haruka is staring at it with a demonic grin, and a growl is heard. An epilogue text states that Koichi was found dead, Shigeyuki's body was discovered in the house, and Haruka's whereabouts remain unknown.

Cast

 Aoi Nakamura as Koichi Yamano
 Noriko Aoyama as Haruka Yamano
 Kazuyoshi Tsumura as Shigeyuki Yamano
 Kōsuke Kujirai as Jun Nagoshi
 Maaya Morinaga as Mai Yaguchi
 Ayako Yoshitani as Misuzu Kure
 Tōze Yamada as the Exorcist
 Shinji Matsubayashi as the Exorcist's Assistant

Release

Theatrical
Paranormal Activity 2: Tokyo Night was released on November 20, 2010 in Japan.

Home media
Paranormal Activity 2: Tokyo Night was released onto rental DVD and Blu-ray on March 4, 2011. It was then released for home entertainment in Japan on April 5, 2011, and internationally on-demand by AMC Theatres on September 13, 2022, as part of a bundle with the rest of the English language film series.

References

External links
 Official website
 
 

2010 films
2010 horror films
2010 independent films
2010 psychological thriller films
2010s Japanese-language films
Japanese psychological thriller films
Camcorder films
Found footage films
Japanese haunted house films
Japanese independent films
Japanese supernatural horror films
Films set in Tokyo
Demons in film
Alternative sequel films
Japanese psychological horror films
2010s Japanese films